Kalateh-ye Nazar Ali (also Romanized as Kalāteh-ye Naz̧ar ‘Alī; also known as Naz̧ar ‘Alī) is a village in Jirestan Rural District, Sarhad District, Shirvan County, North Khorasan Province, Iran. At the 2006 census, its population was 646, in 146 families.

References 

Populated places in Shirvan County